Independence Monument may refer to:

Independence Monument (Albania)
Independence Monument (Brazil)
Independence Monument (Burma)
Independence Monument (Cambodia)
Independence Monument (Colorado)
Independence Monument, Ashgabat
Independence Monument, Kyiv
Independence Monument, Lome
Swadhinata Stambha in Dhaka, Bangladesh